is  the head coach of the Fukushima Firebonds in the Japanese B.League.

Head coaching record

|- 
| style="text-align:left;"|Miyazaki Shining Suns
| style="text-align:left;"|2013
| 24||5||19|||| style="text-align:center;"|10th in Western|||-||-||-||
| style="text-align:center;"|-
|-
| style="text-align:left;"|Rizing Fukuoka
| style="text-align:left;"|2013–14
| 28||11||17|||| style="text-align:center;"|-|||-||-||-||
| style="text-align:center;"|-
|-

References

1982 births
Living people
Aomori Wat's coaches
Fukushima Firebonds coaches
Japanese basketball coaches
Miyazaki Shining Suns coaches
Rizing Zephyr Fukuoka coaches